Wreck Island Natural Area Preserve is a  Natural Area Preserve located in Northampton County, Virginia.  One of the Virginia Barrier Islands, it protects various marsh, beach, grassland, dune, and shrubland habitats. It was designated as part of the National Audubon Society's "Barrier Island/Lagoon System Important Bird Area" for its importance as a nursery for nesting bird colonies. The island, which is slowly migrating towards the mainland, formerly featured dune-like mounds of shells which were destroyed by Hurricane Isabel.

The preserve is owned and maintained by the Virginia Department of Conservation and Recreation. It is open to the public seasonally, with access restricted between mid-April and early September to protect nesting birds. The preserve is accessible only by boat.

See also
 List of Virginia Natural Area Preserves

References

External links
Virginia Department of Conservation and Recreation: Wreck Island Natural Area Preserve

Virginia Natural Area Preserves
Protected areas of Northampton County, Virginia